The Eucoccidiorida are an order of microscopic, spore-forming, single-celled parasites belonging to the apicomplexan class Conoidasida. Protozoans of this order include parasites of humans, and both domesticated and wild animals including birds. Among these parasites are the Toxoplasma gondii that cause toxoplasmosis and Isospora belli, which results in isosporiasis.

Definition
This is the largest order in the class Conoidasida and contains those species that all undergo merogony (asexual), gametogony (sexual) and sporogony (spore formation) during their lifecycles.

Genera
Nineteen families, three subfamilies, and 70 genera are recognised in this order.  The genera include:

Adelea, Adelina, Aggregata, Alveocystis, Atoxoplasma, Babesiosoma, Barrouxia, Bartazoon, Besnoitia, Calyptospora, Caryospora, Caryotropha, Chagasella, Choleoeimeria, Cryptosporidium, Crystallospora, Cyclospora, Cyrilia, Cystoisospora, Dactylosoma, Desseria, Diaspora, Dorisa, Dorisiella, Eimeria, Elleipsisoma, Epieimeria, Frenkelia, Ganapatiella, Gibbsia, Goussia, Gousseffia, Grasseella, Hammondia, Haemogregarina, Hemolivia, Hepatozoon, Heydornia, Hoarella, Hyaloklossia, Isospora, Ithania, Karyolysus, Klossia,  Klossiella, Lankesterella, Legerella, Margolisiella, Mantonella, Merocystis, Nephroisospora, Neospora, Octosporella, Orcheobius, Ovivora, Pfeifferinella, Polysporella, Pseudoklossia, Pythonella, Rasajeyna, Sarcocystis, Schellackia, Selenococcidium, Selysina, Sivatoshella, Skrjabinella, Spirocystis, Toxoplasma, Tyzzeria, Wenyonella

Among the heteroxenous and cyst-forming genera are: Besnoitia, Cystoisospora, Frenkelia, Hammondia, Neospora, Sarcocystis, and Toxoplasma.

Taxonomy
The taxonomy of this group is complex and only partly understood. Two major clades have been identified: the isosporoid coccidia (Toxoplasma, Neospora, Isospora [in part], and Sarcocystis) and a second clade containing Lankesterella, Caryospora and the eimeriid coccidia (Cyclospora, Isospora [in part] and Eimeria). Isospora is more closely related to the Toxoplasma/Neospora clade than to Sarcocystis.

Families
About 1,000 species are in the genus Eimeria.

Some of the genera have been organised into families.

Family Barrouxiidae
Genera
Barrouxia
Goussia
Family Sarcocystidae 
Genera
Besnoitia
Cystoisospora
Neospora
Sarcocystis
Toxoplasma

References

External links

  Taxon: Order Eucoccidiorida Léger & Duboscq, 1910 , The Taxonomicon.

Apicomplexa orders